Leonine facies is a facies that resembles that of a lion. It is seen in multiple conditions and has been classically described for lepromatous leprosy as well as Paget's disease of bone. It is a dermatological symptom, with characteristic facial features that are visible on presentation, and is useful for focusing on differential diagnosis.

Associated conditions

Differential diagnoses include the following:

 Lepromatous leprosy
 Paget's disease of bone
 Mycosis fungoides
 Polyostotic fibrous dysplasia
 Amyloidosis
 Actinic reticuloid
 Cutaneous T cell lymphoma
 Leishmaniasis
 Lipoid proteinosis
 Progressive nodular histiocytosis
 Mastocytosis
 Hyperimmunoglobulin E syndrome, also known as Job's syndrome

See also 
 Facies
 Leontiasis ossea

References 

Symptoms and signs: Skin and subcutaneous tissue